St. Mark's College is a high school in the town of Jane Furse in Limpopo Province, South Africa. The school was founded by the brothers of the Community of the Resurrection in the first half of the twentieth century, it is no longer an Anglican church school, but rather a public school on private property.  The school's governing council is chaired by the bishop of the Diocese of St Mark the Evangelist.

Notes and references

External links 

St. Mark's College Trust

High schools in South Africa